Nomreh-ye Noh or Nomreh 9 may refer to:
 Nomreh-ye Noh, Ramhormoz